Seclusion is the third album by the French gothic metal band Penumbra released under Season of Mist on October 20, 2003.

Track listing 
All songs written by Jarlath (Maxime Meheust).
 "Tragical Memories" (5:49)
 "Cursed Destiny" (4:24)
 "Seclusion" (5:56)
 "The Prophetess" (4:59)
 "Hope" (5:39)
 "Crimson Tale" (6:13)
 "Conception" (6:39)
 "Enclosed" (5:23)

Personnel

Penumbra 
Jarlaath - Vocals, Oboe
Zoltan	- Keyboards
Dorian	- Guitars
Anita Covelli - Vocals
Néo - Guitars
Agone - Bass
Arathelis - Drums

Additional musicians 
Ameylia Saad - Soprano
Emilie Lesbros, Emmanuelle Zoldan - Alto Vocals 
Damien Surin - Bass Vocals
Hubert Piazzola - Baritone
Loic Taillebrese - Flute

References

External links
Penumbra official site discography 
Metallum Archives
Discogs.com

2003 albums
Season of Mist albums
Penumbra (band) albums